The sixth season of The Voice began on 24 April 2017. Delta Goodrem was the only coach to reprise her role from the fifth season. She was joined by returning coach, Seal, returning for his third season after a three-year absence and new additions Boy George and Kelly Rowland, replacing Jessie J, The Madden Brothers and Ronan Keating, respectively. Judah Kelly from Team Delta won the competition on 2 July 2017, marking Goodrem's second and final win as a coach.

Coaches and hosts

In July 2016, Jessie J announced her departure from The Voice after two seasons, commenting "I've loved doing the show, I've done four seasons: two in the U.K., two in Sydney, but I just need to make another album." In November, it was confirmed that Delta Goodrem would be returning for her fifth season as coach, whilst Seal would be returning for his third season after a three-year hiatus to replace Jessie J. On 8 December 2016, it was announced that former The Voice UK coach Boy George would be joining the show as the third coach replacing The Madden Brothers. On 24 December 2016, via the show's Facebook page, it was announced that former The X Factor USA judge Kelly Rowland would be joining the panel as the fourth and final coach to replace Ronan Keating.

Teams
Color key

Blind auditions 

Color key

Episode 1 (24 April) 

The coaches performed a cover of "Vertigo" together at the start of the show.

Episode 2 (25 April)

Episode 3 (26 April)

Episode 4 (30 April)

Episode 5 (1 May)

Episode 6 (2 May)

Episode 7 (7 May)

Episode 8 (8 May)

Episode 9 (14 May)

Episode 10 (15 May)

The Knockouts 

The first episode of the knockouts aired on 21 May 2017. Each knockout round pits 3 artists from the same team against each other, with only one act winning each round. The judges also get two 'steals' each for the entirety of the knockouts, which allows them to steal a rejected act from another team.

Color key

Episode 11 (21 May)

Episode 12 (22 May)

Episode 13 (23 May)

Battle rounds 
The first episode of the Battle Rounds was first broadcast on 28 May 2017.

Color key

Episode 14 (28 May)
The coaches performed a cover of "Dream On" together at the start of the show.

Episode 15 (29 May)

The Live Shows

Episode 16 (4 June)
The first episode of the Live shows was first broadcast on 4 June 2017.

Episode 17 (11 June)

Australian sister band The Veronicas performed their new single "The Only High".

Episode 18 (18 June)
 Performance from Hailee Steinfeld with her song Most Girls/Starving.
 Performance from Jennifer Hudson with her new single "Remember Me".

The Semi-Finals
The semi-finals will first broadcast on 25 June 2017. At the end of this episode, four artists will advance to the grand final, while the other four will be eliminated.

Guest Performances
 Alfie Arcuri: "If They Only Knew".
  Jessica Mauboy: "Fallin'".

Notes
 Judah Kelly's rendition of "Hallelujah" reached #3 on the Australian iTunes chart.
 With the eliminations of Sarah Stone and Berni Harrison, this is the first time in two seasons that each coach has an artist advance to the Grand Finale.

Grand Finale
The Grand Finale was first broadcast on 2 July 2017.

Notes
 Judah Kelly's single "Count On Me" reached #1 on the Australian iTunes chart.
 Hoseah Partsch's single "Paper Planes" reached #3 on the Australian iTunes chart.

Live Shows Elimination Chart

Overall
Artist's info

Result details

Team

Result details

Contestants who appeared on previous shows or seasons
Aydan Calafiore was previously a cast member of the 2012 reboot of Network Ten's Young Talent Time and auditioned on Australia's Got Talent in 2013.
Grace Laing auditioned for The Voice Kids and made it to the top 6.
Claire Howell originally auditioned for season 5, where she was eliminated during the battle rounds.
Kelsie Rimmer originally auditioned for season 1, where she was eliminated during the battle rounds.
Judah Kelly auditioned for season 4 and season 6 of the Australian The X Factor but didn't make it to the live shows.
Michelle Mutyora was a member of the 2012 reboot of Network Ten's Young Talent Time.
Ellis Hall auditioned for season 5 of the Australian The X Factor part of Straight Up but didn't make it to the live shows and auditioned for season 6 but this time made the live shows as a member of Younger Than Yesterday and got eliminated in 12th place.
Chelsea J Gibson competed on season 1 of Australian Idol and was eliminated in the semi-finals.

Ratings

References

6
2017 Australian television seasons